The 2011–12 Florida Gators men's basketball team represented the University of Florida in the sport of basketball during the 2011–12 college basketball season. The Gators competed in Division I of the National Collegiate Athletic Association (NCAA) and the Southeastern Conference (SEC).  They were led by head coach Billy Donovan, and played their home games in the O'Connell Center on the university's Gainesville, Florida campus.

The Gators finished the SEC regular season with a 10–6 conference record, and lost to Kentucky in the semifinals of the 2012 SEC tournament. They received an at-large bid in the 2012 NCAA tournament as a No. 7 seed in west region where they advanced to the Elite Eight before losing to Louisville.

Previous season
The Gators finished the 2010–11 season 29–8, 13–3 in SEC play and lost in the Elite Eight round of the NCAA tournament to Butler. Senior small forward Chandler Parsons won SEC Player of the Year honors and head coach Billy Donovan was named SEC Coach of the Year. Parsons and senior power forward Vernon Macklin were both selected in the 2011 NBA draft.

Roster
Retrieved from Gatorzone.com

Coaches

Team statistics 
As of March 24, 2012. 
 Indicates team leader in specific category.
Retrieved from Gatorzone.com

Schedule and results
Retrieved from Gatorzone.com

|-
!colspan=11| Exhibition

|-
!colspan=11| Regular season (Non-conference play)
|-

|-
!colspan=8| Regular season (SEC conference play)
|-

|-
!colspan=8| SEC tournament
|-

|-
!colspan=8| NCAA tournament
|-

|-
| colspan="8" | *Non-Conference Game. Rankings from AP poll. All times are in Eastern Time.  Tournament seedings in parenthesis.  
|}

Rankings

Awards and honors 
 Bradley Beal
 SEC Freshman of the Week (11/21/11–11/28/11). Beal averaged 8.5 points, seven rebounds, two assists and 1.5 steals in two wins over Wright State and Jacksonville.
 SEC Freshman of the Week (12/5/11–12/12/11). Beal averaged 13.5 points and five rebounds in two wins over Arizona and Rider.
 SEC Freshman of the Week (12/19/11–12/26/11). Beal averaged 17 points, six rebounds, two steals and one assist in two wins over Mississippi Valley State and Florida State.
 SEC Freshman of the Week (1/23/12–1/30/12). Beal averaged 14 points, three rebounds and 2.5 assists in two wins over Ole Miss and Mississippi State.
 SEC Freshman of the Week (1/31/12–2/6/12). Beal averaged 16.5 points, nine rebounds and two assists in two wins over South Carolina and Vanderbilt.
 SEC Freshman of the Week (2/13/12–2/20/12). Beal averaged 17.5 points, 8.5 rebounds and three assists in two road wins over Alabama and Arkansas. 
 First-Team All-SEC 
 SEC All-Freshman Team

 Kenny Boynton
 SEC Player of the Week (12/12/11–12/19/11). Boynton scored 22 points, two assists, one rebound and a steal in a win over Texas A&M.
 First-Team All-SEC

 Erving Walker
 Second-Team All-SEC

 Will Yeguete
 2012 SEC Community Service Team

 Patric Young
 SEC Player of the Week (12/5/11–12/12/11). Young averaged 18.5 points  on 77.3 percent shooting (17–22) and 10 rebounds in two wins over Arizona and Rider.
 SEC Scholar-Athlete of the Year

References

Florida Gators men's basketball seasons
Florida
Florida Gators men's basketball team
Florida Gators men's basketball team
Florida